Classic Military Vehicle is a military magazine published monthly in the United Kingdom by Key Publishing. It features articles and photographs of military vehicles, armoured and soft-skin, past and present, from around the world.

The first editor was Pat Ware. In 2007, he handed it over to John Blackman, a well-known military vehicle photographer.

It was first published in May 2001 (cover dated June 2001). In the same month, another magazine covering the same subject, Military Machines International, also began publication. This was at a time when the long-running quarterly, Wheels & Tracks magazine, had ceased publication, leaving a gap in the market.

Starting with the December 2014 issue Classic Military Vehicle merged with the magazine Military Machines International.

References

External links
Classic Military Vehicle website

Military magazines published in the United Kingdom
Transport magazines published in the United Kingdom
Magazines established in 2001
Monthly magazines published in the United Kingdom